The Kacheguda–Madurai Weekly Express is an Express train belonging to South Central Railway zone that runs between  and  in India. It is currently being operated with 17615/17616 train numbers on a weekly basis.

Service

The 17615/Kacheguda–Madurai Weekly Express has an average speed of 52 km/hr and covers 1289 km in 24h 45m. The 17616/Madurai–Kacheguda Weekly Express has an average speed of 51 km/hr and covers 1289 km in 25h 10m.

Route and halts 

The important halts of the train are:

Coach composition

The train has standard ICF rakes with a max speed of 110 kmph. The train consists of 18 coaches:

 1 AC II Tier
 2 AC III Tier
 7 Sleeper coaches
 6 General Unreserved
 2 Seating cum Luggage Rake

Traction

Both trains are hauled by a Gooty Loco Shed-based WDP-4D diesel locomotive from Kacheguda to Madurai and vice versa.

Rake sharing

The train shares its rake with 12789/12790 Mangalore Central–Kacheguda Superfast Express.

Direction reversal

The train reverses its direction 2 times:

See also 

 Kacheguda railway station
 Madurai Junction railway station
 Mangalore Central–Kacheguda Express

Notes

References

External links 

 17615/Kacheguda–Madurai Weekly Express India Rail Info
 17616/Madurai–Kacheguda Weekly Express India Rail Info

Transport in Hyderabad, India
Transport in Madurai
Express trains in India
Rail transport in Tamil Nadu
Rail transport in Andhra Pradesh
Rail transport in Telangana
Railway services introduced in 2017